Kent Ronald Hance (born November 14, 1942) is an American politician and lawyer who is the former Chancellor of the Texas Tech University System. In his role, he oversaw Texas Tech University, Texas Tech University Health Sciences Center and Angelo State University in San Angelo, Texas.  He is also a lobbyist and lawyer. Hance subsequently defeated future President George W. Bush and became a Democratic member of the United States House of Representatives from West Texas, having served from 1979 to 1985. After his congressional service, he switched to the Republican Party and in 1990 ran for governor of Texas, losing in the primary election.

In 2006, Hance was chosen as the third chancellor to succeed David Smith as the chancellor of the Texas Tech University System in Lubbock. Before retiring as chancellor in 2014, he took a leave of absence from his Austin law firm Hance Scarborough, LLP but continued to sit on profit and nonprofit boards and commissions while he was at the helm of Texas Tech. The Lubbock Avalanche-Journal quoted Texas Tech board chairman Rick Francis: "The regents believed Hance could further the goals that we had for our chancellor, in terms of energizing our alumni, and those legislators in both Austin and Washington, D.C., and provide the vision that we need for the future."

Early years and election to Congress
Hance obtained his Bachelor of Business Administration degree in finance from the Rawls College of Business at Texas Tech University in 1965 where he was also a member of Delta Tau Delta, which he served as president. He also served as the Student Government Association Vice-president and was a member of the Saddle Tramps.

He later attended the University of Texas School of Law. During his time as a law student, he was the Student Bar Association President and chosen as recipient of the Counsel Award. After law school, he was admitted to the Texas bar and in 1968 became a practicing attorney in Lubbock, Texas. During this period, he was also a law professor at Texas Tech from 1968 until 1973.

In 1974, Hance ran for the Texas Senate and defeated incumbent H.J. "Doc" Blanchard in the 1974 primary. His campaign at the beginning seemed doomed to failure, but Hance quickly made connection with voters in the sprawling West Texas district.

1978 election vs. George W. Bush 
He served in the state senate from 1975 to 1979.  After winning the 1978 Democratic primary nomination for the Lubbock-based 19th Congressional District, he defeated the Republican nominee George W. Bush of Midland. The seat, which was based in Lubbock, had been held since inception by popular Democrat George H. Mahon, long-time chairman of the House Appropriations Committee (the 19th included most of the Permian Basin at the time). Bush won the Republican nomination in a hard-fought but low-turnout runoff primary against the 1976 party nominee, Jim Reese of Odessa.

The 19th had long been one of the more conservative areas of Texas.  It was one of the first areas of Texas to move away from its Democratic roots; it hadn't supported a Democrat for president since 1964. However, at the time, conservative Democrats continued to represent much of the region at the state and local levels, and would do so well into the 1990s. Hance claimed Bush was "not a real Texan" because of his privileged upbringing and Yale education. Hance won by seven points—the only time that the future 43rd President of the United States was ever defeated in an election.

Tenure in Congress 
As a Democratic member of Congress during 1979–1985, Hance was a member of the "boll-weevil" conservative Democrats. As such, he became one of President Ronald Reagan's allies and carried his tax-cut, the nation's largest tax cut, in 1981.

Hance was reelected two times. His voting record was very conservative even by Texas Democrat standards; he compiled a lifetime rating of 72 from the American Conservative Union.

Run for Senate 
He did not run for a fourth term in 1984, opting instead to seek the Democratic nomination for the Senate seat being vacated by the retiring John Tower. Hance announced within hours of Tower's withdrawal that he would run for the Senate. No candidate received a majority vote in the primary, so Hance, along with State Senator Lloyd Doggett of Austin, advanced to a run-off. He was defeated by only 1,345 votes by Doggett, who lost the general election for Senate but later served many years in the House.

Hance had received a great deal of support from conservative Republicans who crossed party lines to vote for him in the race, since Hance had run on a conservative platform. Geography also played a role in Hance's loss to Doggett; no one from west of San Antonio has ever represented Texas in the U.S. Senate.

Hance endorsed one of his aides, Don R. Richards, in the Democratic primary for his congressional seat. Richards won the nomination, but was defeated in the general election by a young Republican, Larry Combest, a former aide to Tower. Proving just how Republican this district had become at the national level, Richards only tallied 41.9 percent of the vote—one of only two times since Hance left office that a Democrat has cleared 40 percent of the vote.

Party switch
Hance switched parties from Democratic to Republican in 1985. In 1986, he unsuccessfully sought the Republican gubernatorial nomination. Instead, the Republicans called former Governor Bill Clements out of retirement for the right to challenge Democratic Governor Mark White. In 1988, Hance was a Texas delegate to his first ever Republican National Convention, which met in New Orleans.

In 1987, Clements appointed his former intraparty rival Hance to a vacancy on the Texas Railroad Commission.

In 1988, Hance was elected as a Republican to the commission on the coattails of presidential nominee George H. W. Bush, the father of George W. Bush whom Hance had defeated in the 1978 election for the 19th Congressional District. He left the Railroad Commission in 1990, once again to seek the Republican nomination for governor but was heavily defeated in the primary by controversial Midland businessman Clayton Williams. In the primary against Williams, Hance finished second but with only 15 percent of the ballots.

Hance donated money to George W. Bush's campaign for Governor of Texas in 1994  .

Kent R. Hance Chapel
On May 1, 2011, Texas Tech University announced that Kent Hance provided the largest gift, $1.75 million, toward the $3 million privately funded non-denominational campus chapel, named the Kent R. Hance Chapel designed by McKinney York Architects.

Awards
In 1985, Hance received the Texas Tech Alumni Association Distinguished Alumni Award. 
In 2009, Hance received the South Plains Council Boy Scouts of America John F. Lott Distinguished Citizen Award.
In 2009–2010, Hance received the Outstanding Texas State Leader Award at the Annual Texas Leadership Forum, presented by the John Ben Shepperd Public Leadership Institute. Additionally, Hance received the Hope Award from the National Multiple Sclerosis Society West Texas Chapter in April 2010.

Retirement

After raising $1.69 billion in funds for Texas Tech, Hance announced on October 13, 2013, that he would step down as chancellor at some time in 2014. The regents voted to name him chancellor-emeritus upon his retirement. His contract expired in December 2013 but he continued in the position until July 2014, when his successor Robert Duncan was named chancellor. Hance has residences in both Austin and Lubbock.

Trivia
In the 2008 Oliver Stone film W., Hance is portrayed by actor Paul Rae.

Footnotes

External links
 
 http://www.lubbockonline.com/stories/101906/loc_101906028.shtml
Papers, 1953–1984 and undated, in the Southwest Collection/Special Collections Library at Texas Tech University
 

1942 births
American legal scholars
Chancellors of the Texas Tech University System
Living people
Members of the Railroad Commission of Texas
People from Dimmitt, Texas
People from Lubbock, Texas
Rawls College of Business alumni
Texas lawyers
Texas Republicans
Texas state senators
Texas Tech University faculty
University of Texas School of Law alumni
Democratic Party members of the United States House of Representatives from Texas
People from Castro County, Texas
Members of Congress who became lobbyists